Qaleh Gah (also Romanized as Qal‘eh Gāh; also known as Qal‘eh Ghah) is a village in Amirabad Rural District, Muchesh District, Kamyaran County, Kurdistan Province, Iran. At the 2006 census, its population was 302, in 59 families. The village is populated by Kurds.

References 

Towns and villages in Kamyaran County
Kurdish settlements in Kurdistan Province